Libuše Švormová (born 23 August 1935) is a Czech actress. She has appeared in over 45 films and television shows since 1959.

Selected filmography
 Lovers in the Year One (1973)

References

External links

1935 births
Living people
Czech film actresses
Actresses from Prague
Czech stage actresses
Recipients of the Thalia Award